SpongeBob SquarePants is an animated television series.

SpongeBob SquarePants may also refer to:
 SpongeBob SquarePants (character), the main character of the television series
 SpongeBob SquarePants (film series), a series of film adaptations
 SpongeBob SquarePants (franchise), the multimedia franchise
 SpongeBob SquarePants (musical), a musical adaptation
 Seasons of the television series:
 Spongebob SquarePants (season 1)
 Spongebob SquarePants (season 2)
 Spongebob SquarePants (season 3)
 Spongebob SquarePants (season 4)
 Spongebob SquarePants (season 5)
 Spongebob SquarePants (season 6)
 Spongebob SquarePants (season 7)
 Spongebob SquarePants (season 8)
 Spongebob SquarePants (season 9)
 Spongebob SquarePants (season 10)
 Spongebob SquarePants (season 11)
 Spongebob SquarePants (season 12)
 Spongebob SquarePants (season 13)
 SpongeBob SquarePants video games, the collection of video games in the franchise